Chenarestan-e Sofla (also Romanized as Chenārestān-e Soflá; also known as Chenārestān-e Pā’īn) is a village in Sarrud-e Jonubi Rural District, in the Central District of Boyer-Ahmad County, Kohgiluyeh and Boyer-Ahmad Province, Iran. At the 2006 census, its population was 1,137, in 214 families.

References 

Populated places in Boyer-Ahmad County